Hide and Seek (Machboim) is an Israeli drama film, directed by Dan Wolman and released in 1980. Billed as the first Israeli film ever to address themes of homosexuality, the film is set in Mandatory Palestine in 1946.

The film centers on Uri, a young boy who lives with his grandfather as his parents are involved in the resistance movement against the British occupation. He has a warm and friendly relationship with his tutor Balaban, but follows him one day and witnesses him having sex with an Arab man, leading to tragic consequences when he reports Balaban to the Haganah. The film's cast includes Gila Almagor, Benyamin Armon, Chaim Hadaya, Efrat Lavie, Rahel Shor and Doron Tavory.

References

External links 
 

1980 films
Israeli drama films
Films directed by Dan Wolman
1980s Hebrew-language films
Israeli LGBT-related films
LGBT-related drama films
1980 LGBT-related films
Films set in 1946